54th Infantry may refer to:

54th Infantry Regiment (France)
54th Infantry Regiment (United States)
54th Massachusetts Volunteer Infantry

See also
 54th Regiment of Foot (disambiguation)